Sugar is a class of edible substances. 

Sugar may also refer to:

Places 
 Sugar Creek (disambiguation), various waterways in the United States
 Sugar Island (disambiguation), various islands in North America
 Sugar Mountain (North Carolina)
 Sugar River (disambiguation), various rivers in the United States

People

Nickname 
 Sugar Cain (1907–1975), Major League Baseball pitcher
 Rashad Evans (born 1979), American mixed martial artist nicknamed "Sugar"
 Jessica Kiper (born 1979), Survivor contestant, nicknamed "Sugar"
 Sugar Ray Leonard (born 1956), American boxer
 Sugar Ray Marimón (born 1988), Major League Baseball pitcher from Colombia
 Sugar Minott (1956–2010), Jamaican reggae singer, producer
 Shane Mosley (born 1971), American boxer nicknamed "Sugar"
 Sugar Blue (James Whiting, born 1950), American blues harmonica player
 Sugar Ramos (born 1941), Cuban-Mexican boxer
 Micheal Ray Richardson (born 1955), American former basketball player and head coach
 Sugar Chile Robinson (born 1938), American blues and boogie child prodigy pianist
 Sugar Ray Robinson (1921–1989), American boxer
 Sugar Ray Seales (born 1952), U.S. Virgin Islands-born American boxer

Stage name or ring name
 Sugar Lyn Beard (born 1981), Canadian actress, stage name "Sugar"
 Sugar, a female professional wrestler from the Gorgeous Ladies of Wrestling

Surname 
 Sugár, a Hungarian-language surname, of different etymology
 Alan Sugar (born 1947), English entrepreneur and TV personality
 Bert Sugar (1937–2012), American boxing writer and sports historian
 Leo Sugar (1927-2020), American football player
 Maurice Sugar (1891–1974), American political activist and labor attorney
 Rebecca Sugar (born 1987), American animator, composer and director
 Ronald Sugar (born 1948), American businessman, former chairman of the board, and chief executive officer of Northrop Grumman Corporation

Arts, entertainment, and media

Fictional characters
 Sugar, the titular character in A Little Snow Fairy Sugar 
 Sugar, a Batman Forever character
 Sugar Motta, a Glee character
 Sugar, one of the protagonists of Sugar and Spike, a DC Comics comic book series (1956-1971)
 Sugar, a character from Total Drama: Pahkitew Island

Films  
 Sugar (2004 film), a Canadian romantic drama film
 Sugar (2008 film), an American baseball drama film
 Sugar (2013 film), an American drama film
 Sugar (2019 film), a Ghanaian musical romantic comedy film

Music

Groups 
 Sugar (American band), an alternative rock band of the 1990s
 Sugar (South Korean group), South Korean group active 2001-2006
 the two female vocalists in Dave & Sugar, a country music trio

Labels
 Sugar Music, an Italian record label

Albums
 Sugar (15& album), 2014
 Sugar (Aloha album), 2002
 Sugar (Claw Boys Claw album), 1992
 Sugar (Dead Confederate album), 2010
 Sugar (Etta Jones album), 1979
 Sugar (Robin Schulz album), 2015
 Sugar (Stanley Turrentine album), 1971
 Sugar (Tokio album), 2008
 Sugar (Tonic album), 1999
 Sugar, by Nancy Sinatra, 1967

Songs
 "Sugar" (Armand Van Helden song), 2005
 "Sugar" (Editors song), 2013
 "Sugar" (Flo Rida song), 2009
 "Sugar" (Ladytron song), 2005
 "Sugar" (Maceo Pinkard song), 1926
 "Sugar" (Maroon 5 song), 2014
 "Sugar" (My Bloody Valentine song), 1989
 "Sugar" (Peking Duk and Jack River song), 2019
 "Sugar" (Robin Schulz song), 2015
 "Sugar" (Brockhampton song), 2020
 "Sugar" (System of a Down song), 1998
 "Sugar" (Natalia Gordienko song), 2021
 "Sugar (Gimme Some)", by Trick Daddy featuring Ludacris, Lil' Kim, and Cee-Lo Green
 "Sugar", by Aaron Carter from his album Another Earthquake!
 "Sugar", by Bikini Kill from their album Pussy Whipped
 "Sugar", by Garbage from their album Not Your Kind of People
 "Sugar", by Karmin from their album Leo Rising
 "Sugar", by Lenny Kravitz from his album Are You Gonna Go My Way
 "Sugar", by Leona Lewis from her album Glassheart
 "Sugar", by Simple Minds from their album Cry
 "Sugar", by Sofia Carson from her album Sofia Carson
 "Sugar", by Stevie Wonder from his album Signed, Sealed & Delivered
 "Sugar", by Tiny Lights from their album Stop the Sun, I Want to Go Home
 "Sugar", by Tori Amos from her album To Venus and Back and b-side from her China single

Other arts, entertainment, and media
 Sugar (musical), a 1972 musical
 Sugar, half of the duo Milk & Sugar, German house music producers and record label owners
 Sugar Magazine, a former girls teen magazine
 Sugar (Canadian TV series), Canadian cooking show
 Sugar (American TV series), American reality web series

Computing 
  Sugar (software), an open source desktop environment for children
 SugarCRM, a company providing customer relationship management (CRM) software
 Syntactic sugar, syntactical elements of a computer language added primarily for convenience

Other uses 
 Sugar Bowl, an annual American college football bowl game
 Sugar (company), Indian cosmetics company founded by Vineeta Singh

See also 
 Sugar City (disambiguation)
 Sugar, Sugar (disambiguation)
 Big Sugar, a nickname of Matt Cain (born 1984), American retired Major League Baseball pitcher
 Sugaring (epilation), a method of hair removal
 Sugarland (disambiguation)
 Suger, a French abbot
 Sugaar, a Basque deity

Lists of people by nickname